Quero Me Apaixonar is the sixth album in the live praise and worship series of Christian Contemporary music by Diante do Trono.

Background 

In the pre-recording of the Quero Me Apaixonar, the mining group released the Nos Braços do Pai album, recorded at the Ministries Esplanade, in Brasilia. The live recording of the album brought an audience of more than 2 million, according to the military police. Recorded at the Campo de Marte Airport in Santana, São Paulo neighborhood.

The album sold about 800,000 copies in Brazil thus receiving Triple Platinum album, charting successes in churches throughout Brazil including "Eu Nasci de Novo" and "Quero Me Apaixonar" (theme song).

Quero Me Apaixonar garnered multiple 2004 Talent Trophies: Best CD of the Year, Best Live CD and Best Praise and Worship CD, Ana Paula Valadão as Best Female Interpreter and the ministry was recognized again as Group of the Year.

Track listings

CD

DVD

References

2003 live albums
2003 video albums
Live video albums
Diante do Trono video albums
Diante do Trono live albums
Portuguese-language live albums